Luninets is a town in Brest Region, Belarus. It serves as the administrative center of Luninets District. It has a population of 24,000, and is immediately east of the Pinsk district within Brest. It is home to Luninets air base.

History 
Luninets is said to be mentioned in print sources dating to 1540. Within the Grand Duchy of Lithuania, it was part of Nowogródek Voivodeship. In 1793, the town was acquired by the Russian Empire in the course of the Second Partition of Poland. In 1888, while under Russian sovereignty, a railway junction was built in Luninets, linking it by rail to Warsaw, Rivne, Vilna and Homel, and a proper railroad station was added in 1905.

Luninets became part of the Second Polish Republic in 1921 following the Polish-Soviet War. In September 1939, Luninets was occupied by the Red Army and, on 14 November 1939, incorporated into the Byelorussian SSR.

Luninets was occupied by Nazi Germany from 10 July 1941 until 10 July 1944 and administered as a part of the Generalbezirk Wolhynien und Podolien of Reichskommissariat Ukraine. After 1944, Luninets remained part of the Soviet Union until 1991, at which time it became part of the newly independent Republic of Belarus.

The Jewish population was important in the town. From 1941 to 1943, 4 000 Jews were murdered in mass executions perpetrated by an Einsatzgruppe.

Education
In Luninets there are 2 vocational colleges - polytechnic and agricultural production.

Transport
In the beginning of 20th century, Luninets became an important railway junction. In 1884-1886, train traffic was opened to Gomel, Rovno, Vilna and Brest, a large railway junction with a depot, workshops and other buildings was built near the village, a railway station was built.

References

External links 

 Site of Belarus city Luninets
 Extensive resource on Jewish Luninets
 Photos on Radzima.org
 Photo and video Luninets
 

 
Luniniec
Towns in Belarus
Nowogródek Voivodeship (1507–1795)
Pinsky Uyezd
Polesie Voivodeship
Jewish Belarusian history
Jewish communities
Holocaust locations in Belarus
Luninets District